GURPS Reign of Steel a role-playing sourcebook introduced in 1997
A Reign of Steel a novel introduced in 2014